William Murrell may refer to:
 William Murrell (physician) (1853–1912), English physician, clinical pharmacologist, and toxicologist
 William Murrell (politician, died 1892), state legislator in Louisiana
 William Murrell Jr. (1845–1932), state legislator in Louisiana

See also
 Willie Murrell (1941–2018), American basketball player
 William Murrill (1869–1957), American mycologist